The 2011 Conference Premier play-off Final, known as the 2011 Blue Square Bet Premier play-off Final for sponsorship purposes, was a football match between AFC Wimbledon and Luton Town on 21 May 2011 at the City of Manchester Stadium in Manchester. It was the ninth Conference Premier play-off Final and the first to be played at the City of Manchester Stadium. AFC Wimbledon won the match 4–3 in a penalty shoot-out following a 0–0 draw after extra time to secure promotion to League Two, thus entering the Football League for the first time in the club's nine-year history.

Match

Details

References

Play-off Final 2011
2011
Play-off Final 2011
Play-off Final 2011
Conference Premier play-off Final
National League play-off final
2010s in Manchester
Play-off National League Final 2011